January Revolution may refer to:

 Janeirinha, Portugal (1868)
 January Storm, China (1967), also known as the January Revolution
 Egyptian Revolution of 2011
 2021 United States Capitol attack
 2022 Kazakh protests

See also
 January Uprising (disambiguation)